Pople Hill is a mountain located in the Catskill Mountains of New York east of Sundown. Bangle Hill is located northwest, Mombaccus Mountain is located northeast, and Flat Hill is located southeast of Pople Hill.

References

Mountains of Ulster County, New York
Mountains of New York (state)